Saracha is a genus of flowering plants belonging to the family Solanaceae. It is in the Solanoideae subfamily.

It is native to Bolivia, Colombia, Ecuador, Peru and Venezuela.

The genus name of Saracha is in honour of Isidoro Saracha (1733–1803), a Spanish monk, apothecary and botanist at the Abbey of Santo Domingo de Silos. 
It was first described and published in Fl. Peruv. Prodr. on page 31 in 1794.

Known species
According to Kew:
Saracha andina 
Saracha ferruginea 
Saracha guttata 
Saracha ovata 
Saracha pubescens 
Saracha punctata 
Saracha quitensis 
Saracha spinosa

References

Solanaceae
Solanaceae genera
Plants described in 1794
Flora of Bolivia
Flora of Colombia
Flora of Ecuador
Flora of Peru
Flora of Venezuela